The Perry County Courthouse is located at Main and Pine Streets in the commercial heart of Perryville, Arkansas, the seat of Perry County.  It is a two-story brick building, with a hip roof.  It is very simply styled, with rectangular two-over-two windows set in unadorned openings (some in pairs).  Its main entrance is deeply recessed in an opening framed by pilasters and an entablatured, with multi-light sidelight windows to either side of the door.  The courthouse was built in 1888, and was the county's third.  It has been enlarged by single-story wings to either side.

The building was listed on the National Register of Historic Places in 1976.

See also
National Register of Historic Places listings in Perry County, Arkansas

References

Courthouses on the National Register of Historic Places in Arkansas
Government buildings completed in 1888
County courthouses in Arkansas
National Register of Historic Places in Perry County, Arkansas
Individually listed contributing properties to historic districts on the National Register in Arkansas
1888 establishments in Arkansas